Beregama is a genus of South Pacific huntsman spiders that was first described by D. B. Hirst in 1990.

Species
 it contains four species, found in Papua New Guinea and Australia:
Beregama aurea (L. Koch, 1875) (golden huntsman) – Australia (Queensland, New South Wales)
Beregama cordata (L. Koch, 1875) (fire-back huntsman) – Australia (Queensland, New South Wales)
Beregama goliath (Chrysanthus, 1965) – New Guinea
Beregama herculea (Thorell, 1881) – New Guinea

See also
 List of Sparassidae species

References

Araneomorphae genera
Sparassidae
Spiders of Australia